Aladdin: Original Motion Picture Soundtrack is the soundtrack for the 1992 Disney animated feature film, Aladdin. The album was released by Walt Disney Records on CD and cassette tape on November 10, 1992. The soundtrack was intertwined with demos, work tapes and unreleased masters, as well as original scores in 1994 in a four-disc box set entitled The Music Behind the Magic: The Musical Artistry of Alan Menken, Howard Ashman & Tim Rice. A remastered reissue with altered lyrics and new artwork was released on March 27, 2001. A special edition reissue featuring two previously released demos and new artwork was released on September 28, 2004. The Legacy Collection: Aladdin was released on September 9, 2022 to coincide with the 30th anniversary of Aladdin.

The music on the album earned composer Alan Menken the Academy Award for Best Original Score and the Golden Globe Award for Best Original Score, as well as a nomination for the BAFTA Award for Best Film Music. Menken, along with lyricist Tim Rice, also won the Academy Award for Best Original Song, the Golden Globe Award for Best Original Song, and a Grammy Award for Song of the Year for the song "A Whole New World". It is currently the first and only Disney song to win Song of the Year at the Grammy Awards. The album is one of the best-selling soundtrack albums to an animated film, with 3million copies sold in the United States and 300,000 copies sold in Canada.

Track listing

Notes

Unreleased songs and score

Cut songs
Howard Ashman and Alan Menken composed several songs for an initial story treatment of Aladdin prior to beginning work on Beauty and the Beast. This story treatment incorporated several plot elements from the original folk tale and additional characters that were eliminated during later story development. Three songs from this score - "Arabian Nights", "Friend Like Me" and "Prince Ali" - survive in the final film.

Menken composed several additional songs for the subsequent story revisions following Ashman's 1991 death, prior to Tim Rice's involvement with the project.

Work tape, demo and master recordings of cut songs have been released in several formats, notably on the 1994 The Music Behind the Magic box set, the 2004 special edition soundtrack and the 2004 DVD release of the film.

1990 Original Score - music by Alan Menken, lyrics by Howard Ashman.
Arabian Nights
Arabian Nights (Reprise #1)
Babkak, Omar, Aladdin, Kassim
Arabian Nights (Reprise #2)
Friend Like Me
To Be Free
Proud of Your Boy – A demo version performed by Menken was featured on the 2004 special edition soundtrack. A pop version recorded by Clay Aiken was included on the 2004 DVD release of the film. In 2011, it was restored in the film's stage musical adaption.
How Quick They Forget
Arabian Nights (Reprise #3)
High Adventure – A demo version performed by Menken and Ashman was featured on the 2004 special edition soundtrack.
Arabian Nights (Reprise #4)  — This was later used as the ending for Aladdin and the King of Thieves.

Additional Menken/Ashman demos
Call Me a Princess – A cover version was recorded by actress/singer Kerry Butler and released on her first solo album, Faith, Trust & Pixie Dust in May 2008.
Humiliate the Boy

Menken solo demos
Count on Me

Menken/Tim Rice demos
Why Me
My Time Has Come
My Finest Hour

Accolades

Charts

Weekly charts

Year-end charts

Certifications and sales

See also
The Music Behind the Magic
 Aladdin (2019 soundtrack)

References

External links
Cut lyrics from Aladdin

1992 soundtrack albums
1990s film soundtrack albums
Soundtrack
Disney animation soundtracks
Disney Renaissance soundtracks
Albums produced by Alan Menken
Grammy Award for Best Musical Album for Children
Walt Disney Records soundtracks
Fantasy film soundtracks
Musical film soundtracks
Alan Menken soundtracks
Howard Ashman soundtracks
Scores that won the Best Original Score Academy Award